Wheat Ridge/Ward station (sometimes stylized as Wheat Ridge•Ward) is a Regional Transportation District (RTD) commuter rail station and terminus of the G Line. It opened on April 26, 2019, along with the rest of the G Line, after years of delays.

The station is located in Wheat Ridge, Colorado, United States, on the south side of West 50th Place between Ward Road and Tabor Street. It includes bus bays and a 290-stall park and ride on the north side of West 50th Place. Public art at the station includes "Anchored by Place", a steel-and-bronze sculpture by Michael Clapper.

The station is the only stop within the city of Wheat Ridge, and is being prepared by the city for transit-oriented development. In 2016, voters in Wheat Ridge approved a $12 million sales tax to improve roadways and other infrastructure around the area to lure development. A  lot northeast of the station is slated to be developed into 230 apartments and 80 townhomes.

References

External links

Wheat Ridge TOD Vision

Railway stations in the United States opened in 2019
RTD commuter rail stations
Wheat Ridge, Colorado
2019 establishments in Colorado